Daniel Köllerer and Frank Moser were the defending champions, but they didn't play this year.
Rameez Junaid and Philipp Marx won in the final 7–5, 6–4, against Tomasz Bednarek and Aisam-ul-Haq Qureshi.

Seeds

Draw

Draw

References
 Doubles Draw

Baden Open - Doubles